Paleoconus is a genus of belemnite from the Mississippian Epoch.

See also

 Belemnoidea
 Belemnite
 List of belemnites

References

Belemnites
Carboniferous cephalopods
Extinct animals of the United States